"I'm Always Here", (also known as "I'll Be Ready") is a song by Jimi Jamison and it is most recognized as the theme of the popular 1990s TV series Baywatch, used for seasons 2 through 10.

Jamison is credited as the lyricist on this song along with Joe Henry, who co-wrote the Rascal Flatts hit "Skin" (not to be mistaken for the Joe Henry who wrote Madonna's "Don't Tell Me"). The music is credited to Cory Lerios and John D'Andrea. The line, "I won't let you out of my sight," whilst appropriate song for a TV series about lifeguards, is more likely related to a commitment to a girl, telling her that the singer will always be there for her. An instrumental version was used as the ending theme of seasons 6 to 9 and a different instrumental version was used as the theme for season 10 (the first season of Baywatch: Hawaii).

Music video
The music video for "I'm Always Here" features Jimi Jamison performing throughout the bay, mixed with scenes from the TV series.

Other versions
Other versions of "I'm Always Here" include:

 The instrumental version of the song is featured in the outro of the show in later seasons. 
 An instrumental version of the song appears in the episode "Battles" of the UK television programme Spaced.
 Swedish electronic musical group Sunblock remixed the song and released it under the title "I'll Be Ready" on 9 January 2006. This version reached number 12 in Sweden, number four in the United Kingdom, and number eight in Denmark.
 German dance act Bass Bumpers had a UK hit single in 2006 with a mash-up of the song and "Phat Planet" by Leftfield. This new version was entitled "Phat Beach (I'll Be Ready)" (with the group being credited as Naughty Boy on this Ministry Of Sound release) and got to number 36 on the UK Singles Chart.
 A soundalike version was used in the Hey Arnold! episode "Summer Love" over the end credits.
 Swedish group Konditorns recorded the theme with Swedish lyrics for their album K2 (2012), titled "Jag är alltid här" which is a direct translation of the phrase "I'm always here".
 The album version is melodically different from the single version due to the year release of both.
 While the single version reached the top ten of America's Greatest Hits in 1996, the album version entered the top 100 in the German charts in 1999.
 In 2005 Andrew Spencer created a house version of the song featuring Pit Bailay on the vocals, it provided quite some success in german clubs as well as in a few other european countries.

In popular culture
The song is well used in different soundtracks:

 1991–2001 Baywatch (TV series)
 1998 Wrongfully Accused
 2001 Spy Game
 Video on Trial (TV series) Totally Beachin' Video on Trial (2008)
 The Xtra Factor (TV series) episode #5.9 (2008)
 Britain's Got Talent (TV series) Auditions 1 (2011)
 2012 Piranha 3DD
 2012 Hansi Hinterseer – Traumhaftes Seenland im Salzkammergut (TV movie)
 Mike and Mike in the Morning (TV series) episode September 2, 2014
 Tosh.0 (TV series) Climate Change Comedian (2016)
 American Dad! (TV series) episode "Bahama Mama" (2016)
 2017 Baywatch movie
 The Tonight Show Starring Jimmy Fallon (TV series) episode – Dwayne Johnson/Ellie Kemper/Charlie Puth (2017)
 Die Magie des Eises: Linzer Eiszauber 2018 (TV movie)
 Coast Lives (TV series documentary) episode #1.1 (2018)
 Piers Morgan's Life Stories (TV series) episode – Pamela Anderson (2018)
 Good Morning Britain (TV series) – episodes May 15, 2017; May 16, 2017; May 19, 2017; April 17, 2018
 Britain's Got More Talent (TV series) episode #12.12 (2018)
 Wedding Day Winners (TV series) episode #1.5 (2018)

References

1991 songs
1993 singles
1999 singles
Baywatch
Jimi Jamison songs
Songs written by Cory Lerios
Songs written by Jimi Jamison
Songs written by Joe Henry